Ndahiro II Cyamatare was Mwami, or king, of the Kingdom of Rwanda at the end of the fifteenth century. He reigned between 1477 and 1510, during a period of conflict. He was killed in the Gisenyi district fighting the king of the Bugara, and his son, Ruganzu II Ndoli, succeeded him.

References

15th-century monarchs in Africa
Rwandan kings
15th-century births
16th-century monarchs in Africa
Place of birth unknown
Year of birth unknown
Year of death unknown